Joaquim Carvalho may refer to:
 Joaquim Carvalho (field hockey)
 Joaquim Carvalho (footballer)
 Joaquim Carvalho (cyclist)